The 2015–16 Ligue Inter-Regions de football is the ? season of the league under its current title and ? season under its current league division format. A total of 64 teams (16 in each group) would be contesting the league, but SC Mecheria in Group West didn't start. The league started on September 18, 2015.

League table

Group West

Group Centre-West

Group Centre-East

Group East

References

Inter-Régions Division seasons
4